Jotham Clement Pellew (13 September 1978 – 18 August 2006) was a New Zealand wrestler. He competed in the men's Greco-Roman 54 kg at the 2000 Summer Olympics where he finished in 20th and last place. Pellew was educated at Ngaruawahia High School beginning in 1992. He died on 18 August 2006 and was buried at Hamilton Park Cemetery.

References

1978 births
2006 deaths
New Zealand male sport wrestlers
Olympic wrestlers of New Zealand
Wrestlers at the 2000 Summer Olympics
Sportspeople from Hamilton, New Zealand
Burials at Hamilton Park Cemetery
People educated at Ngaruawahia High School